The Cieszyn Silesian dialect or Teschen Silesian dialect (Cieszyn Silesian: cieszyńsko rzecz;  or ; ; Silesian: ćeszyński djalekt) is one of the Silesian dialects. It has its roots mainly in Old Polish and also has strong influences from Czech and German and, to a lesser extent, from Vlach and Slovak. It is spoken in Cieszyn Silesia, a region on both sides of the Polish-Czech border. It remains mostly a spoken language. The dialect is better preserved today than traditional dialects of many other West Slavic regions.

On the Czech side of the border (in Zaolzie) it is spoken mainly by the Polish minority, where it was and still is strongly influenced mainly by Czech (mainly lexicon and syntax). It is used to reinforce a feeling of regional solidarity.

Polish and Czech linguists differ in their views on the classification of the dialect. Most Czech linguists make a distinction between the dialect as spoken in Czechia and in Poland, and classify the dialect spoken on the Czech side of the border as a "mixed Czech-Polish dialect", a designation already used in the 19th century. Polish linguists tend to classify the language on both sides of the border under the Silesian dialects of Polish. Although the dialect has its roots mainly in Polish (phonology and morphology are consistently shared with Polish), the diachronic development of the dialect is of a transitional nature.

Name
The Cieszyn Silesian has been known by various names over the years. The modern speakers refer to it as cieszyńsko rzecz, and is also commonly referred by them as po naszymu, which means "in our own way", a self-designation also encountered for other Slavic varieties in the Carpathians. In the past, the dialect has been mostly lumped together with other, territorially bigger languages/dialects: beginning with Polish (Latin concio Polonica), "Moravian" ("moravski / po moravsku"), diluted Polish (Wasserpolnisch) or less pejoratively Silesian-Polish (schlesisch-polnisch), but mostly with Silesian by the Upper Silesians and Poles. The Polish linguists have mostly seen it as part of the Silesian dialect, first in 1974 recognising the Cieszyn Silesian dialect (narzecze cieszyńskie) as a specific and distinct subgroup of that dialect (Stanisław Bąk, 1974; Alfred Zaręba, 1988; Bogusław Wyderka, 2010). As such, from the 1990s the Cieszyn Silesian dialect became an object of the debate, whether Silesian is a separate language or just a dialect. The Gorals in the south of Cieszyn Silesia do not call their dialect Silesian but Goral (Górolski) and have more Vlach and Slovak influence.

History
The language of Cieszyn Silesia was a result of a historical evolution, shaped by the territory's geographical location, affected by political affiliation and migrations of people. The region was almost always peripheral—at the south-eastern edge of Silesia and the Diocese of Wrocław, in Poland under the Piast dynasty, and as a fee of the Kingdom of Bohemia—however it is located near the wide, northern opening of the Moravian Gate, on the most popular if not the shortest route from Prague or Vienna to Cracow, and from Wrocław to Upper Hungary (modern day Slovakia).

In a few decades after the establishment of the Duchy of Teschen, roughly at the same time it became a fee of the Kingdom of Bohemia (1327), written documents began to be produced in the local ducal chancellery. They closely followed patterns set by the capital of the country, Prague, including and foremost the chancellery language: Latin, German (alongside Latin from 1331), Czech (increasingly dominant over German from the mid-15th century). Probably due to the peripheral location and a certain level of autonomy the cancellaria bohemica in the Duchy of Teschen was preserved after the Battle of White Mountain (1620), in contrast to the region of Bohemia. The chancellery language did not reflect the ethnic composition of the majority of the population of Cieszyn Silesia, however it did affect the preference of the well established Czech over reimposed German, as it was linguistically much closer to the Cieszyn Silesian dialect.

The earliest traces of the vernacular language were exposed in place names, as they were first mentioned in Latin and/or German-speaking documents. They sometimes contained nasal vowels, one of the first traits differentiating early medieval Polish and Czech: they were present in the place names later inhabited by Cieszyn Silesian-speaking people, like Dambonczal (Dębowiec), but not in the area settled by Moravian-Lach population. From the 13th and consolidated in the 14th century was the spirantization g ≥ h, another major trait delineating from then on Polish and Czech, as well as Lach and Cieszyn Silesian dialects. Even after the introduction and dominance of Czech as an official language, those place names were adapted to the chancellary language only partially, for example Dębowiec as Dubowiec instead of Dubovec, or Ogrodzona as Ogrozena instead of Ohrazena, however for example Dombrowa continued to be written with the nasal vowel even in the Czech documents.

In the late 15th century (Brenna) the Vlachs reached the Silesian Beskids, bringing the shepherds culture and vocabulary, although they were by that time linguistically mostly Polish. In the mid 16th century the population of the region became in large part Protestant and Duchy of Teschen itself soon lost territorial integrity: among others the Frydek state country with the majority of regional Moravian/Lach-speakers, who also remained mostly Roman Catholic. On the other end of the duchy emerged the Bielsko state country, dominated by German-speaking Lutherans.

From the 16th century onward, more and more text was produced outside of the ducal chancellery in Teschen. Many of the inhabitants of the region were not proficient in Czech and wrote in a more idiosyncratic manner which reflected the vernacular language. A bill of a locksmith from Fryštát, who in 1589 tried to issue it in the most prestigious at that time official language, was so riddled with mistakes, that some researchers (Zbigniew Greń) consider it to be written de facto in a local variety of Polish, thus the very first Polish document in the region. The vernacular language especially seeped into half-official and unofficial written documents, like diaries (zapiśniki dlo pamięci) or even chronicles written by local rural authors (piśmiorze) from the early 18th century, earlier than anything known in Poland. Probably the most discussed and analysed of them is the first Polish, rural bookplate by Jura (Jerzy) Gajdzica (1777-1840) from Cisownica. The text was written primarily in the local dialect, but was stylized to resemble standard Polish:

Depending on the education of the writer a varying level of code-switching between Czech, Moravian, Silesian and Polish can be observed, which apparently didn't impede much the communication between the Slavic speakers, as opposed to the language barrier, that could and often did exist between the local Slavic and German speaking population.

After the First Silesian War in 1742 the majority of Silesia was annexed by the Kingdom of Prussia. The influence of Czech in Upper Silesia, to that date similar in scope to the Duchy of Teschen, quickly waned, replaced by the growing imposition of the German culture and language, especially after 1749. This led to attempts of approximation of the two codes and large influx of the German borrowings, embodied in the term Wasserpolaken, later adopted also by the Austrian Germans. The Austrian Silesia, the part of the Silesia that remained in the Habsburg Empire, with the Duchy of Teschen and the neighbouring but separate state countries, in 1783 administratively became part of the Moravian Governorship, which, contrary to the Prussian Silesia, led to strengthening of the influence of Czech. For example, the text books for local schools were produced in Brno in the standard form of Czech, which was together with the dialect commonly referred to as "Moravian" ("moravski / po moravsku"), even though , the local overseer of Catholic schools from the year 1804 strove to replace it with Polish textbooks. His petitions were generally ignored/left unanswered by the education office in Brno.

The situation began to change in the 1860s and 1870s. In 1860 Polish and Czech were recognised as the local auxiliary languages in the province. This led to unprecedented, unfettered development of the Polish official language in primary schools and offices. The higher education remained German-speaking, which the Polish activists tried to change as well. For example, in 1874 , a Polish deputy to the Imperial Council of Austria, proposed to open a Polish-speaking teachers' seminar in Teschen, as well as a Czech-speaking one in Troppau (Opava). This was strongly opposed by Eduard Suess, who called the local language not Polish, but Wasserpolnisch, a Polish-Czech mixture, not used in books.

From the 19th century up to World War II the dialect, like all Silesian dialects, was strongly influenced mainly by German, which at that time gained the most prestigious status, and increasing proportion of the urban population, not just in Bielsko and Teschen, but also in smaller towns were German speakers. After World War I two new nation states emerged: Poland and Czechoslovakia, followed by Polish–Czechoslovak border conflicts. The region was divided in 1920 by these two states. After that division the dialect in the Czech part of the region was and still is strongly influenced mainly by Czech (mainly lexicon and syntax), with most new vocabulary, aside from English loanwords, borrowed from Czech. On the other hand, in the Polish part it was and still is influenced by standard Polish.

Status

The Cieszyn Silesian dialect is spoken by around 200,000 people in the Czech Republic. It is mainly used by the Polish minority, but also by some people of Czech and Slovak ethnicity in the same area. The Czech government considers the Cieszyn Silesian dialect to be a variety of Polish, and Polish is a recognised minority language in the Karviná and Frýdek-Místek Districts, where the dialect is natively spoken.

In Poland, because of the closer linguistic relationship between the dialect and standard Polish, the dialect is becoming diluted more quickly than in the Czech Republic.

Mutual intelligibility

Grammatically and phonologically, the Cieszyn Silesian dialect is closer to Polish than to Czech. Czechs who are not familiar with the dialect may therefore have considerable difficulty understanding it. The mutual intelligibility with other dialects of Polish is generally higher.

Classification

Cieszyn Silesian is a transitional dialect, located roughly at the mid-point of a dialect continuum connecting Czech, Slovak, and Polish. Polish linguists tend to classify it as a Silesian Polish dialect, and thus maintain that the territory of Polish extends into Czech Silesia. This interpretation emphasizes the history of the dialect over the current situation, as it has its roots mainly in Polish. The other view, which is generally favoured by Czech and Slovak linguists, emphasizes a more recent distinction between the dialect spoken on the Polish side of the border from the dialect on the Czech side, with the latter considered to have become a "mixed Czech-Polish dialect". Since the border dividing Cieszyn Silesia was created in 1920, there has been increased language contact with Czech, in particular the neighbouring Lachian dialects and, more recently, Common Czech.

In the early 19th century Jerzy Samuel Bandtkie was the first Polish researcher (of German descent) trying to argue in the spirit of the Age of Enlightenment that Silesian has Polish and not Czech roots. In his dissertation Wiadomości o języku polskim w Szląsku i o polskich Szlązakach Bandtkie [wrongly] placed the border of Polish along the Ostravice River.

A two-volume survey of the dialect on the Czech side of the border was undertaken by Adolf Kellner in the 1940s, which named it "Eastern Lachian", thus grouping it together with the Lachian dialects. This was a politically motivated decision, however, as the Nazi censors would have forbidden publication of any title that linked Slavic languages to the recently annexed Cieszyn region.

The earliest linguistically scientific modern subdivision of the Silesian dialects in Poland dates to Stanisław Bąk (1974), inspired by early 19th century work by Jerzy Samuel Bandtkie. He recognised the Cieszyn Silesian dialect as a distinct subgroup of Silesian, followed by other linguists (Zaręba, Wyderka), who occasionally omitted the Czech part of the region from the territory of the Silesian dialects.

Phonology

Vowels

Cieszyn Silesian has the following vowel phonemes:

This system has been attested on both sides of the border, but some speakers on the Czech side do not have the close-mid vowel . Unlike in Standard Polish, there are no nasal vowels, and the vowel  can appear soft (palatalized) consonants, as well as hard ones. Unlike in Czech and Slovak, vowel length is not phonemically distinctive.

Consonants

The basic system of consonant phonemes of the Cieszyn Silesian dialect is as follows:

The dialect as spoken in the area around Jablunkov merges the postalveolar and pre-palatal fricatives, realising both as alveo-palatal.

Vocabulary

The native Slavic vocabulary of the Cieszyn Silesian dialect consists of some words shared with modern Czech and some words shared with modern Polish. It also contains words which has become obsolete in modern Polish but whose cognates are still used in Czech. Cieszyn Silesian has borrowed heavily from German, specifically the Silesian German dialects spoken in the area, and also contains some "Carpathianisms" of Romance, Albanian, Hungarian and East Slavic origin, which are mostly words relating to the pastoral lifestyle of shepherds in the highlands.

Literature

The main standard languages used in Cieszyn Silesia are Czech and Polish; in the past, German and Latin were also used. However, several writers and poets wrote in the dialect, including Adolf Fierla, Paweł Kubisz, Jerzy Rucki, Władysław Młynek, Józef Ondrusz, Karol Piegza, Adam Wawrosz and Aniela Kupiec. Poets who wrote in Cieszyn Silesian generally regarded their work as part of the Polish literary tradition, rather than belonging to a new standard language, by contrast to Ondra Łysohorsky, who wrote in a Lachian literary standard of his own creation.

Example text

The Lord's Prayer in the Cieszyn Silesian dialect, with Czech and Polish for comparison:

See also 
 Cieszyn Vlachs
 Tutejszy

Notes

References

Footnotes

Further reading

External links 
 Cieszyn Silesian-Czech Dictionary

Polish dialects
Languages of the Czech Republic
Languages of Poland